Ababeel Missile (lit. Ababeel) is a surface-to-surface medium-range ballistic missile developed by Pakistan. It is "aimed at ensuring survivability of Pakistan's ballistic missiles in the growing regional Ballistic Missile Defence (BMD) environment", in response to the Indian anti-ballistic missile systems.

As such, it would be Pakistan's first missile with this capability. It can carry total 1,500 kg ( 3,307 lb) warhead , which consists of three standard warheads of 500 kg ( 1102.3 lb) each or 5 of 300 kg ( 661.4 lb) or 8 maximum Warheads weighing 185 kg (408 lb) .  

Ababeel is developed by KRL, which have previously developed liquid powered Ghauri missile system. From this it can be expected that Ababeel is also a liquid fueled missile. However, some sources suggest that Ababeel is said to be a development of the Shaheen-III airframe and solid-fuel motors, but with a payload fairing of enlarged diameter to accept the MIRV warhead. The second stage is also lengthened. If it's really the development of Shaheen-3 missile then the warhead carrying capacity is increased but the range is decreased from 2,750 km ( 1,709 mi ) to 2,200 km ( 1,400 mi).

The first publicly announced test launch was conducted on 24 January 2017. As of June 2017 no missiles were thought to be operationally deployed.

See also 
 List of missiles of Pakistan
 MIRV
Shaheen-III

References 

MIRV capable missiles
Medium-range ballistic missiles of Pakistan
Military equipment introduced in the 2010s